Ciacco is one of the characters in the Divine Comedy by Dante Alighieri that was not yet well defined by historians. This is how he presents himself to Dante when he is in Hell:

This way introducing himself allows us to interpret it in various ways, but one of the oldest commentators of the Comedy suggests a derogatory nature of this name: "Ciacco is said to be a pig's name, hence he was called this way for his gluttony."

Giovanni Boccaccio makes of Ciacco eighth story of the ninth day of the Decameron, describing him as "the most gluttonous fellow that ever lived." However, the reference to Ciacco's name is somewhat ambiguous: he is referred to as the man "whom everyone called Ciacco." It is hard to say if Boccaccio had sources for his writings aside from Dante, because this name has not been found in literature before Dante. According to Vittorio Sermonti, a scholar dedicated to the study of the Comedy, the hypothesis that this Ciacco is the poet Ciacco dell'Anguillara is not true.

References

External links
Novel VIII of the Ninth day of the Decameron

Boccaccio, Giovanni. Decameron. Trans. J. G. Nichols. New York: Everyman's Library/Alfred A. Knopf, 2009. Print.

Fictional ghosts
Characters in the Divine Comedy
Characters in The Decameron